Louis-Benjamin Francœur (1773–1849) was a French mathematician.

References
 

1773 births
1849 deaths
École Polytechnique alumni
19th-century French mathematicians
Members of the French Academy of Sciences
Corresponding members of the Saint Petersburg Academy of Sciences
Scientists from Paris